In robust statistics and computational geometry, simplicial depth is a measure of central tendency determined by the simplices that contain a given point. For the Euclidean plane, it counts the number of triangles of sample points that contain a given point.

Definition
The simplicial depth of a point  in -dimensional Euclidean space, with respect to a set of sample points in that space, is the number of -dimensional simplices (the convex hulls of sets of  sample points) that contain .
The same notion can be generalized to any probability distribution on points of the plane, not just the empirical distribution given by a set of sample points, by defining the depth to be the probability that a randomly chosen -tuple of points has a convex hull that  This probability can be calculated, from the number of simplices that  by dividing by  where  is the number of sample points.

Equivalently, their definition is the average of the number of open simplices and the number of closed simplices that

Properties
Simplicial depth is robust against outliers: if a set of sample points is represented by the point of maximum depth, then up to a constant fraction of the sample points can be arbitrarily corrupted without significantly changing the location of the representative point. It is also invariant under affine transformations of the plane.

However, simplicial depth fails to have some other desirable properties for robust measures of central tendency. When applied to centrally symmetric distributions, it is not necessarily the case that there is a unique point of maximum depth in the center of the distribution. And, along a ray from the point of maximum depth, it is not necessarily the case that the simplicial depth decreases monotonically.

Algorithms
For sets of  sample points in the Euclidean plane 
the simplicial depth of any other point  can be computed in time 
optimal in some models of computation.
In three dimensions, the same problem can be solved in time 

It possible to construct a data structure using ε-nets that can approximate the simplicial depth of a query point (given either a fixed set of samples, or a set of samples undergoing point insertions) in near-constant time per query, in any dimension, with an approximation whose error is a small fraction of the total number of triangles determined by the samples. In two dimensions, a more accurate approximation algorithm is known, for which the approximation error is a small multiple of the simplicial depth itself. The same methods also lead to fast approximation algorithms in higher dimensions.

While the time complexity of most other data depths grows exponentially, the spherical depth grows only linearly in the dimension  – the straightforward algorithm for computing the spherical depth takes . Simplicial depth (SD) is linearly bounded by spherical depth.

References

Computational geometry
Robust statistics